Ernest John Henley (31 March 1889 – 14 March 1962) was a British athlete who competed mainly in the 400 metres.

He competed for Great Britain in the 1912 Summer Olympics held in Stockholm, Sweden in the 4 x 400-metre relay where he won the bronze medal with his teammates George Nicol, James Soutter and Cyril Seedhouse.

References

1889 births
1962 deaths
British male sprinters
Olympic bronze medallists for Great Britain
Athletes (track and field) at the 1912 Summer Olympics
Olympic athletes of Great Britain
Medalists at the 1912 Summer Olympics
Olympic bronze medalists in athletics (track and field)